Carl Blake Willis (born December 28, 1960) is an American former professional baseball pitcher and current pitching coach for the Cleveland Guardians of Major League Baseball (MLB). He was previously the pitching coach for the Boston Red Sox and the Seattle Mariners.

Willis played for nine seasons in the majors as a relief pitcher for the Detroit Tigers, Cincinnati Reds, Chicago White Sox and Minnesota Twins. He is best known as a pitching coach for five Cy Young winners, the second most in MLB history.

Playing career
Willis was born on December 28, 1960, in Danville, Virginia. He grew up in Yanceyville, North Carolina. After high school, he attended the University of North Carolina at Wilmington. As a major leaguer, Willis was a member of one World Series championship team: the Twins in the 1991 World Series. In nine seasons he had a 22–16 win–loss record, 267 games, 2 games started, 81 games finished, 13 saves, 390 innings pitched, 424 hits allowed, 210 runs allowed, 184 earned runs allowed, 28 home runs allowed, 115 walks allowed, 222 strikeouts, 2 hit batsmen, 20 wild pitches, 1,668 batters faced, 25 intentional walks, 3 balks and a 4.25 ERA. He was worth 1.9 career WAR according to Baseball Reference.

Coaching career
From 2003 to 2009 he served as the pitching coach for the Cleveland Indians.

On November 30, 2009, Willis was named the Seattle Mariners minor-league pitching coordinator.  On August 9, 2010, Willis was promoted to the Seattle Mariners coaching staff as the new pitching coach, replacing Rick Adair who was fired along with manager Don Wakamatsu and bench coach Ty Van Burkleo. He served in this capacity until 2013.

In 2015, Willis was named to be the pitching coach for the Columbus Clippers in the Cleveland Indians organization.

On May 9, 2015, Willis was named as the pitching coach for the Boston Red Sox, replacing Juan Nieves.

On October 26, 2017, Willis was re-hired by the Indians as pitching coach, replacing Mickey Callaway.

Willis has had five pitchers win Cy Young Awards during his time as their pitching coach: CC Sabathia in 2007, Cliff Lee in 2008, Félix Hernández in 2010, Rick Porcello in 2016, and Shane Bieber in 2020.

In May 2022, Willis assumed managerial duties for a few games after a COVID-19 outbreak among Guardians coaching staff that saw Manager Terry Francona, First Base Coach Sandy Alomar Jr., Bench Coach DeMarlo Hale, Third Base Coach Mike Sarbaugh, Hitting Analyst Justin Toole, Assistant Pitching Coach Joe Torres, and Hitting Coach Chris Valaika all end up on the COVID list.

References

Further reading

External links

, or Retrosheet

1960 births
Living people
American expatriate baseball players in Canada
Baseball coaches from Virginia
Baseball players from Virginia
Birmingham Barons players
Boston Red Sox coaches
Bristol Tigers players
Cincinnati Reds players
Chicago White Sox players
Cleveland Indians coaches
Colorado Springs Sky Sox players
Denver Zephyrs players
Detroit Tigers players
Edmonton Trappers players
Evansville Triplets players
Lakeland Tigers players
Major League Baseball pitching coaches
Major League Baseball pitchers
Minnesota Twins players
Minor league baseball coaches
Nashville Sounds players
Portland Beavers players
Seattle Mariners coaches
Sportspeople from Danville, Virginia
UNC Wilmington Seahawks baseball players
Vancouver Canadians players
People from Yanceyville, North Carolina